Andreas Hirzel (born 25 March 1993) is a Swiss professional footballer who plays as a goalkeeper for FC Thun.

Career 
Hirzel made his Bundesliga debut at 29 August 2015 against 1. FC Köln replacing René Adler after 40 minutes in a 2–1 away defeat.

References 

1993 births
Living people
Swiss men's footballers
Association football goalkeepers
Swiss Super League players
Swiss Challenge League players
Bundesliga players
Regionalliga players
FC Aarau players
Grasshopper Club Zürich players
FC Baden players
FC Wangen bei Olten players
Hamburger SV II players
Hamburger SV players
FC Vaduz players
Swiss expatriate sportspeople in Liechtenstein
Expatriate footballers in Liechtenstein
FC Thun players
Swiss expatriate footballers
Swiss expatriate sportspeople in Germany
Expatriate footballers in Germany
Footballers from Zürich